Bogdan Tirnanić (Serbian Cyrillic: Богдан Тирнанић) (September 14, 1941 – January 16, 2009) was one of the most prominent Serbian journalists, essayists and movie critics. He was born in Belgrade, Serbia. He wrote columns for some of the most popular newspapers in the SFR Yugoslavia and Serbia, including Politika, Borba, NIN, Dnevni telegraf etc.  He was awarded some of the most important awards in Yugoslav and Serbian journalism, such as Croatian Veselko Tenžera award. Along with Igor Mandić, he was one of the leading journalists in Yugoslavia.

His career also includes notable appearances in popular Serbian movies Early Works ("Rani radovi") and The Black Bomber (Crni bombarder). He was a member of the managing board of the football club Red Star Belgrade. He died in Belgrade in January 2009.

Personal
Tirnanić's first cousin once removed (colloquially: "uncle") was Yugoslav football icon Aleksandar Tirnanić. He was married to Serbian actress :sr:Dara Džokić, they have one daughter together.

External links

1941 births
2009 deaths
Journalists from Belgrade
Yugoslav journalists
20th-century journalists